Tupchi (also Topchi, Topci, and Kala Topchi) is a village in Bamyan Province, Afghanistan.

See also
Bamyan Province

References

Populated places in Bamyan Province